Ouwehands Dierenpark is a zoo in Rhenen, in the Dutch province of Utrecht. The zoo is located on the Laarschenberg, a "mountain" that makes up the south-eastern tip of the great Utrecht Hill Ridge.

History

Chicken farm 
The zoo's founder, Cor Ouwehand, had moved from Rotterdam to Rhenen to start a cigar factory, but changed his mind and started a chicken farm on the Grebbeberg in 1919, where he held a number of other animals as well, including raccoons, peacocks, and pheasants, quickly drawing public interest.

1930s 
During the Great Depression of the 1930s the chicken farm lost much of its business, though people kept coming to look at the animals, leading Ouwehand to turn his farm into a zoo. He visited European zoos to gather ideas, and opened his on 18 June 1932.

The war and after 
The park's commercial success had an unintended side effect. In the run-up to World War II, the Dutch government attempted to secure its defenses against a German invasion. The Grebbe line, a defensive line built in the 1700s to protect the Dutch Water Line, ran right through the Grebbeberg, on which the zoo was built. German officers, in civilian clothes, visited the zoo while the Grebbe line was being rebuilt, and were able to establish from the zoo that the Grebbeberg was a weak spot in the line since the bomb-proof pumping equipment, necessary to inundate the area in the case of an invasion, wouldn't be finished by May 1940. During the ensuing Battle of the Grebbeberg, 11–13 May 1940, the Dutch authorities demanded all the dangerous animals in the zoo be shot to prevent their escape if the zoo got hit. Ouwehand, trusting his own aim better than that of the Dutch soldiers, took it upon himself to do so.

The rebuilding process was slow. Ouwehand died in 1950, and his son Bram and Bram's brother-in-law Jo Baars took over. Compensation for the animals shot in WWII wasn't granted until 1953.

Since then the zoo's area has doubled, to 22 ha. Further expansion was prevented by the municipality, and some animals, including hippos, elephants, gorillas, and chimpanzees were done away with. By the end of the 1990s the zoo was practically bankrupt, receiving less than a half a million visitors per year.

Fortunes turned for the better when, in 2000, the zoo was bought by millionaire businessman Marcel Boekhoorn, who invested in new accommodations for lions, tigers, polar bears, and elephants, and built playgrounds and a new restaurant. Boekhoorn also began a pursuit to bring giant pandas to the zoo (on loan from China), which became reality in 2017.

Timeline 
 1932 – Ouwehands Dierenpark opened
 1940–1945 – Second World War, A number of animals stay as at a farm in Doorn
 1978 – Aquarium opened
 1985 – Primate house opened
 1993 – The bear forest opened
 1995 – Asian Elephants get a new enclosure
 1997 – Tiger forest opened, Elephants relocated
 1998 – Lapponian exhibit with reindeer, eagles and owls opened
 1999 – Beaver enclosure opened
 2000 – Enclosures for polar bears and orangutans opened
 2001 - Urucu (tropical Area) opened
 2003 - Ravot Aapia (the largest European play jungle) is opened
 2004 - Start of ZOOP
 2005 - Umkhosi (African playground with African animals) is opened
 2006 - Two African elephants are added to the zoo
 2007 - At the 75th anniversary of the elephants time at the zoo, a male area is opened
 2009 - A new stay for the Humboldt penguins next to the polar bear stay
 2011 - A new sea lion theater is being delivered
 2013 - Gorilla Adventure opens
 2014 - The renewed Bear Forest is opened
 2015 - A new barnacle aquarium is added. The largest of its kind in Europe.

References

External links 
 Ouwehands Dierenpark

Zoos in the Netherlands
Rhenen